Ron Ward's Meadow With Tadley Pastures is a site of Site of Special Scientific Interest (SSSI). It is based on the edge of Tadley in Hampshire, England. It is managed by the Hampshire and Isle of Wight Wildlife Trust.

Geography

Ron Ward's Meadow With Tadley Pastures covers an area of 11.3 hectares. The SSSI is an area of unimproved meadows
which is managed for hay production. The main part of the site is meadows which are on a south-facing hillside sloping down towards Honeywell Brook. The meadows sit on a mixture of Bracklesham Beds, Lower Bagshot sands and alluvium. Opposite the meadows are two fields, which form the final part of the SSSI.

History

The site was given to the trust as a legacy by Ron Ward.
The area was classed in 1991 as a Site of Special Scientific Interest.

Fauna

The site has the following fauna:

Mammals

Roe deer
European water vole
Bank vole
Yellow-necked mouse
European hare

Birds

Snipe
Eurasian skylark
Northern lapwing

Amphibians

Common frog

Invertebrates

Mother Shipton moth
Burnet companion
Small copper
Common blue
Straw dot moth

Flora

The site has the following flora:

Trees

Aspen
Creeping willow

Plants

References

External links 
 Hampshire and Isle of Wight Wildlife Trust

Sites of Special Scientific Interest in Hampshire
Special Areas of Conservation in England
Tadley